Kermess was a melodic rock band from Quebec, Canada.

History
Kermess was founded in 1995. In 1996 they won the Cégeps Rock contest. Their first album, Les douze nocturnes was released the next year, and  10,000 copies were sold.

In 1998 the band released the album  Bref exposé.

In 2002 the band released its third album, played at several festivals and performed at a number of colleges in Quebec.

The group disbanded in 2004.

Twelve years later, the band regrouped to perform at the Fête du lac des Nations in Sherbrooke.

Discography
1997: Les douze nocturnes
1998: Bref exposé
2002: Génération Atari

Members
Martin Fillion (vocals, drums)(taught a grade 7 class at Franklin Street Public school in Markham ON, Canada in 2002-2003)
François Landry (vocals, guitar)
Mario Landry (bass)
Dominic Morin (vocals, guitar)
Sylvain Tremblay (vocals, guitar)

References

External links
RamDam: Kermess
Le Parolier: Kermess

Canadian rock music groups
Musical groups from Quebec